The consumption of Cannabis in Costa Rica is nominally illegal; however, personal consumption does not carry any criminal penalties. The sale of marijuana, however, can be punished criminally. As of March 2022 medicinal cannabis has been approved.

Interpretation
Laws in Costa Rica are vague on the topic of the legality of marijuana. According to The Costa Rica News, "The Narcotics Law No. 8204 says that it's illegal to sell and produce marijuana on a big scale. It's also illegal to carry marijuana of more than a small dose. That said, the law doesn’t specify how much marijuana qualifies as a 'small dose' or if it's legal to grow the plant for personal use." Many have interpreted this vagueness in the law to mean personal consumption in small dosages are legal in private areas.
Police Enforcement in Costa Rica (Fuerza Pública) does not have a specific protocol to deal with cannabis users, nonetheless in case of possession of "small dosages" (informally considered somewhat between 1 - 8 grams) they will confiscate the drugs. In the case of a larger amount they may proceed with a formal arrest.

As of 2019, cannabis use in Costa Rica is still slightly considered a taboo, nonetheless Costa Rica is one of the countries in the region that generally accepts its consumption.

In March 2019, a project of law was proposed to legalize and regulate medical cannabis and essential cannabis oils in Costa Rica, said project is set to be reviewed by the congress of the republic (Legislative Assembly of Costa Rica).

As of August 2021, only one company has been granted permission to study the viability of Cannabis. ROCO Plants SA of Costa Rica has been growing 12 cultivars for use in country. Led by researcher Daniel O'Bryan starting in July 2020 2 different locations were selected for viability testing. Currently Canas is testing the last set of genetics as the legislature is voting on bill 21,388 in the extra sessions. January 27 to the 29th 2022 a Cannabis Science and Industry Congress will showcase the research completed as well as offering information to help aid in legalization.

The Costa Rican government has time until September 2022 to publish regulations of Legislative Decree No. 10113.

In March 2022, Costa Rica President Carlos Alvarado signed the bill that legalizes marijuana for therapeutic and medicinal use. Recreational use of cannabis continues to be prohibited.

References

Costa Rica
Society of Costa Rica
Politics of Costa Rica
Costa Rica
Costa Rica